Finch is an English surname. Finch was also the surname of the Earls of Winchilsea and Nottingham (now Finch-Hatton) and Earls of Aylesford (now Finch-Knightley).

People with the surname
 Anne Finch, Countess of Winchilsea (1661-1720), English poet
 Anne Finch, Viscountess Conway (1671-1679), English philosopher
 Annie Finch (born 1956), American poet and writer
 Aaron Finch (born 1986), Australian cricketer
 Alfred William Finch (1854–1930), Belgian artist
 Andy Finch,  American snowboarder
 Andrew Finch, American game designer
 Andrew Finch (politician), member of the 41st and the 42nd New York State Legislatures (1818–1819)
 Andrew Thomas Finch ( 1989–2017), 2017 Wichita swatting victim
 Asahel Finch Jr. (1809–1883), American lawyer and politician
 Bill Finch (politician) (born 1956), American politician from Connecticut 
 Brett Finch (born 1981), Australian rugby league player
 Brian Finch (1936–2007), British television scriptwriter and dramatist
 Caleb Finch,  American gerontologist and professor
 Catrin Finch, Welsh harpist
 Clair Finch (1911-1976), American politician and Wisconsin state legislator
 Charles B. Finch, American businessman and political activist
 Charles Finch (disambiguation), multiple people
 Clark Finch (died 1945), Canadian businessman
 Cliff Finch (1927–1986), American politician from Mississippi
 Chris Finch (born 1969), American professional basketball coach
 David Finch (disambiguation), multiple people
 Earl Finch (1830-1888), American politician
 Edward R. Finch (1873–1965), American lawyer and politician
 Elisabeth R. Finch, American television writer
 Ernie Finch (1899–1983), Welsh rugby union player
 Florence Finch (1858–1939), American suffragist, journalist, and novelist
 Florence Finch (1915–2017),  Filipino-American World War II resistance member
 Francis Miles Finch (1827–1907),  American judge, poet, and academic
 Fred Finch (born 1945), Australian politician
 Fred Finch (footballer) (1895–1952), Australian footballer (Australian rules)
 Gary Finch,  New York politician
 George Finch (disambiguation), multiple people
 Harold Finch (1898–1979), Welsh trade unionist and politician
 Harry Finch (1907–1949), Australian rugby player
 Heneage Finch (disambiguation), multiple people
 Horace Finch (born 1906), English organist and pianist
 Isaac Finch (1783–1845),  American politician from New York
 J. Finch (Berkshire cricketer), English professional cricketer
 James Finch (born 1950), American businessman and racing team owner
 Janet Finch (born 1946),  British sociologist
 Jennie Finch (born 1980), American softball pitcher
 Jennifer Finch (born 1966), American musician
 Jessica Garretson Finch (1871–1949), American educator, author, and women's rights activist
 Joel Finch (born 1956), American baseball player
 John Finch (disambiguation), multiple people
 Jon Finch (1942–2012), English actor
 Lance Finch (born 1938), Canadian jurist
 Louisa Finch, Countess of Aylesford (1760–1832), British naturalist and botanical illustrator
 Mark Finch (1961–1995), English promoter of LGBT cinema
 Oscar Finch (1827-1913), American politician
 Peter Finch (1916–1977), English-Australian actor
 Peter Finch (poet), Welsh poet and author
 Phillipa Finch (born 1981), New Zealand netball player
 Rachael Finch (born 1988),  Australian beauty pageant titleholder and television reporter
 Raymond L. Finch (born 1940), judge of the District Court of the Virgin Islands
 Richard Finch (disambiguation), multiple people
 Robert Finch (disambiguation), multiple people
 Roy Finch (disambiguation), multiple people
 Sharif Finch (born 1995), American football player
 Sheila Finch, (born 1935), English-American author
 Stanley Finch (1872–1951), American federal law enforcement executive
 William Coles Finch (1864–1944), British historian and author

Fictional characters
 Adam Finch, a character in The Thing, the 2011 prequel to the 1982 film of the same name
 Atticus Finch or any other member of the Finch family, characters from the books To Kill a Mockingbird and Go Set a Watchman
 Chris Finch, character from the UK TV sitcom The Office
 Cleo Finch,  medical doctor in the television series ER
 Dennis Finch, main character portrayed by David Spade from the US sitcom Just Shoot Me!
 Edith Finch, a character from the PC game "What Remains of Edith Finch"
 Eric Finch,  character from the graphic novel V for Vendetta
 Harold Finch (Person of Interest), a fictional character in the TV series
 J. Pierrepont Finch, protagonist of the musical How to Succeed in Business Without Really Trying
 Paul Finch, character from the popular American teen film series American Pie
 Sidd Finch, fictional baseball player
 Theodore Finch, a character from the young adult novel All the Bright Places
 Tom Finch, a character in Stan Rogers' poem "Finch's Complaint" from the album Fogarty's Cove

See also
 Finch (disambiguation)
 Justice Finch (disambiguation)
 Fink (surname)

English-language surnames
Surnames from nicknames